Justice Spalding may refer to:

John Spalding (Massachusetts judge), associate justice of the Massachusetts Supreme Judicial Court
Burleigh F. Spalding, associate justice of the North Dakota Supreme Court
Rufus P. Spalding, associate justice of the Ohio Supreme Court